Prinaberel (INN, USAN) (developmental code names ERB-041, WAY-202041) is a synthetic, nonsteroidal, and highly selective agonist of the ERβ subtype of the estrogen receptor. It is used in scientific research to elucidate the role of the ERβ receptor. Studies have indicated that selective ERβ agonists like prinaberel could be useful in the clinical treatment of a variety of medical conditions including inflammatory bowel disease, rheumatoid arthritis, endometriosis, and sepsis. Accordingly, prinaberel either was or still is under investigation by Wyeth for the treatment of some of these conditions.

See also
 Diarylpropionitrile
 ERB-196
 Erteberel
 WAY-200070
 WAY-214156

References

External links
 Prinaberel - AdisInsight

Benzoxazoles
Fluoroarenes
Selective ERβ agonists